Nnewi North is a Local Government Area in Anambra State, south-central Nigeria. Nnewi is the only town in Nnewi North LGA. It has four villages (sub-towns) that make up the one-town local government, which includes; Otolo, Uruagu, Umudim and Nnewi-ichi. The traditional ruler of Nnewi- Igwe of Nnewi -presently is Igwe Kenneth Orizu the 3rd of which this royal family is from Otolo Nnewi, and for this reason, is regarded as first among equals of the four villages. Other traditional rulers exist in other villages and they oversee the traditional affairs of their respective villages, amongst which are Obi Nnamdi AC Obi (ogidi)who is obi of Uruagu, Obi Umudim And obi Onyekaba Of Nnewichi. In this vein one may ask who is now Obi of Otolo since the royal family of Igwe oversees the traditional affairs of entire nnewi.

Schools
Here is the list of secondary schools in Nnewi North Local Government Area:
 Girls’ Secondary School, Nnewi
 Maria Regina Model Comprehensive Secondary School, Nnewi
 Nnewi High School, Nnewi
 Nigerian Science & Technical College, Nnewi
 Okongwu Memorial Grammar School, Nnewi
 Women Educational Centre, Nnewi
 Community Secondary School, Nnewichi, Nnewi
 Akoboezem Community Secondary School, Uruagu, Nnewi
 New Era Model Secondary School, Uruagu, Nnewi
 Good Shepherd School, Umudim, Nnewi 
 Christ The Way School, Nnewi

Notable people
 
Joseph Egemonye, Nigerian Journalist
Ebele Ofunneamaka Okeke, former head of the Nigerian Civil Service

References
LOCAL GOVERNMENT AREAS IN ANAMBRA STATE dated July 21, 2007; accessed October 4, 2007

Local Government Areas in Anambra State
Local Government Areas in Igboland